Alessandro André Schöpf (born 7 February 1994) is an Austrian professional footballer who plays as a midfielder for Major League Soccer club Vancouver Whitecaps FC and the Austria national team.

Club career

Bayern Munich
Schöpf joined Bayern Munich in 2009 and spent three years in the junior team before being promoted to the reserve squad in 2012. He made his debut on the opening day of the 2012–13 season in a 1–1 draw with Augsburg II, and would go on to make another 28 appearances as Bayern II finished in second place in the Regionalliga Bayern. His eleven goals that season made him the team's top scorer, behind Marius Duhnke with fourteen. The following season, Schöpf made 34 appearances, again scoring 11 goals, as Bayern II won the Regionalliga Bayern title, but missed out on promotion after losing on away goals in a playoff against SC Fortuna Köln. In November 2013, Schöpf along with teammate Julian Green was given a first-team contract, although he made no appearances during the 2013–14 season as Bayern went on to win the Bundesliga and DFB-Pokal.

1. FC Nürnberg
In July 2014, Schöpf signed for 2. Bundesliga club 1. FC Nürnberg, and was one of six new players to make their debut for the club on the opening day of the 2014–15 season, a 1–0 win over Erzgebirge Aue.

Schalke 04
On 7 January 2016, it was announced that Schöpf moved to Schalke 04 and signed a contract until 2019. Despite suffering a cruciate knee injury, he impressed Schalke manager Domenico Tedesco enough to earn a contract extension to 2021, being praised by Tedesco as "Almost a complete player. He is very diligent and runs many, many kilometres in each game. He is versatile and always wants to play, no matter which position it is. In addition, he is technically savvy, is brave and a great person. We're delighted to be able to continue working with him."

Arminia Bielefeld
On 19 July 2021, Schöpf joined Bundesliga club Arminia Bielefeld after signing a two-year-contract. He left Arminia as it was relegated from Bundesliga at the end of the 2021–22 season.

Vancouver Whitecaps
On 3 August 2022, Schöpf joined the MLS club Vancouver Whitecaps FC signing through the 2024 season with a club option for 2025.

International career
Schöpf has represented Austria at under-16, under-18, under-19 and under-21 level.

On 27 March 2016, Schöpf made his senior debut for Austria, coming on as 87th-minute substitute in a friendly against Albania. He was selected for UEFA Euro 2016, scoring his first goal in a pre-tournament friendly against Malta on 31 May. He scored Austria's only goal of the tournament, equalising against Iceland as they finished bottom of the group with only one point.

Career statistics

Club

International

Scores and results list Austria's goal tally first, score column indicates score after each Schöpf goal.

Honours
Bayern Munich II
Regionalliga Bayern: 2013–14

References

External links

1994 births
Living people
People from Imst District
Footballers from Tyrol (state)
Association football midfielders
Austrian footballers
Austria youth international footballers
Austria under-21 international footballers
Austria international footballers
FC Bayern Munich II players
1. FC Nürnberg players
FC Schalke 04 players
FC Schalke 04 II players
Arminia Bielefeld players
Bundesliga players
2. Bundesliga players
Regionalliga players
Oberliga (football) players
UEFA Euro 2016 players
UEFA Euro 2020 players
Austrian expatriate footballers
Austrian expatriate sportspeople in Germany
Expatriate footballers in Germany
Vancouver Whitecaps FC players
Major League Soccer players
Expatriate soccer players in Canada
Austrian expatriate sportspeople in Canada